Teretia guersi is an extinct species of sea snail, a marine gastropod mollusk in the family Raphitomidae.

Description

Distribution
Fossils of this marine species were found in Late Miocene strata in Denmark

References

 Schnetler, K.I. (2005) The Mollusca from the Stratotype of the Gram Formation (Late Miocene, Denmark). – In: Roth, F. & Hoedemakers, K. (Eds.), The Geology and Palaeontology of the Gram Formation (Late Miocene) in Denmark, Part 1. Palaeontos 7, 62–190.

External links
 Morassi M. & Bonfitto A. (2015). New Indo-Pacific species of the genus Teretia Norman, 1888 (Gastropoda: Raphitomidae). Zootaxa. 3911(4): 560-570 
 

guersi
Gastropods described in 2005